Man of the Forest is a 1933 American pre-Code Western film directed by Henry Hathaway, based upon a novel by Zane Grey, released by Paramount Pictures, and starring Randolph Scott and Verna Hillie.  The supporting cast features Harry Carey, Noah Beery Sr., Barton MacLane, Buster Crabbe and Guinn "Big Boy" Williams.  The film is also known as Challenge of the Frontier (American reissue title).

Hathaway directed much of the same cast (Scott, Beery, Carey and Crabbe) that same year in another Zane Grey story, The Thundering Herd, and also Scott, Beery and Crabbe in To the Last Man, yet another Zane Grey story that year.

Plot 
Based upon a novel by Zane Grey, Man of the Forest involves a young lady (Verna Hillie) who is captured by a band of outlaws led by Clint Beasley (Noah Beery Sr.). Brett Dale (Randolph Scott) figures out their plan and rescues her.

1926 version
This film is a remake of a 1926 version of the same name starring Jack Holt in the role subsequently portrayed by Randolph Scott. Scott's hair was darkened and he wore a moustache in order to more closely match stock footage of Holt playing the part. Warner Oland played Noah Beery's role of Clint Beasley in the earlier film.

Cast

Randolph Scott as Brett Dale
Verna Hillie as Alice Gaynor
Harry Carey as Jim Gaynor
Noah Beery Sr. as Clint Beasley
Barton MacLane as Mulvey
Buster Crabbe as Yegg
Guinn "Big Boy" Williams as Big Casino
Vince Barnett as Little Casino
Blanche Friderici as Mrs. Peg Forney
Tempe Pigott as Madame
Tom Kennedy as Sheriff Blake

Restoration
A 35mm print of the film exists and was exhibited at the Museum of Modern Art in New York City in 2015.

References

External links

1933 films
1933 Western (genre) films
Films based on works by Zane Grey
American Western (genre) films
American black-and-white films
1930s English-language films
Films based on American novels
Films directed by Henry Hathaway
Paramount Pictures films
1930s American films